

Events

Pre-1600
 910 – Battle of Augsburg: The Hungarians defeat the East Frankish army under King Louis the Child, using the famous feigned retreat tactic of the nomadic warriors.
1240 – At the instigation of Louis IX of France, an inter-faith debate, known as the Disputation of Paris, starts between a Christian monk and four rabbis.
1381 – Peasants' Revolt: In England, rebels assemble at Blackheath, just outside London.
1418 – Armagnac–Burgundian Civil War: Parisians slaughter sympathizers of Bernard VII, Count of Armagnac, along with all prisoners, foreign bankers, and students and faculty of the College of Navarre.
1429 – Hundred Years' War: On the second day of the Battle of Jargeau, Joan of Arc leads the French army in their capture of the city and the English commander, William de la Pole, 1st Duke of Suffolk.
1550 – The city of Helsinki, Finland (belonging to Sweden at the time) is founded by King Gustav I of Sweden.

1601–1900
1643 – The Westminster Assembly is convened by the Parliament of England, without the assent of Charles I, in order to restructure the Church of England.
1653 – First Anglo-Dutch War: The Battle of the Gabbard begins, lasting until the following day.
1665 – Thomas Willett is appointed the first mayor of New York City.
1758 – French and Indian War: Siege of Louisbourg: James Wolfe's attack at Louisbourg, Nova Scotia, commences.
1772 – French explorer Marc-Joseph Marion du Fresne and 25 of his men killed by Māori in New Zealand.
1775 – American War of Independence: British general Thomas Gage declares martial law in Massachusetts. The British offer a pardon to all colonists who lay down their arms. There would be only two exceptions to the amnesty: Samuel Adams and John Hancock, if captured, were to be hanged.
1776 – The Virginia Declaration of Rights is adopted.
1798 – Irish Rebellion of 1798: Battle of Ballynahinch.
1817 – The earliest form of bicycle, the dandy horse, is driven by Karl von Drais.
1821 – Badi VII, king of Sennar, surrenders his throne and realm to Isma'il Pasha, general of the Ottoman Empire, ending the existence of that Sudanese kingdom.
1830 – Beginning of the Invasion of Algiers: Thiry-four thousand French soldiers land 27 kilometers west of Algiers, at Sidi Ferruch.
1864 – American Civil War, Overland Campaign: Battle of Cold Harbor: Ulysses S. Grant gives the Confederate forces under Robert E. Lee a victory when he pulls his Union troops from their position at Cold Harbor, Virginia and moves south.
1898 – Philippine Declaration of Independence: General Emilio Aguinaldo declares the Philippines' independence from Spain.
1899 – New Richmond tornado: The eighth deadliest tornado in U.S. history kills 117 people and injures around 200.
1900 – The Reichstag approves new legislation continuing Germany's naval expansion program. It provides for construction of 38 battleships over a 20-year period. Germany's fleet will be the largest in the world.

1901–present
1914 – Massacre of Phocaea: Turkish irregulars slaughter 50 to 100 Greeks and expel thousands of others in an ethnic cleansing operation in the Ottoman Empire.
1921 – Mikhail Tukhachevsky orders the use of chemical weapons against the Tambov Rebellion, bringing an end to the peasant uprising.
1935 – A ceasefire is negotiated between Bolivia and Paraguay, ending the Chaco War.
1939 – Shooting begins on Paramount Pictures' Dr. Cyclops, the first horror film photographed in three-strip Technicolor.
  1939   – The Baseball Hall of Fame opens in Cooperstown, New York.
1940 – World War II: Thirteen thousand British and French troops surrender to Major General Erwin Rommel at Saint-Valery-en-Caux.
1942 – Anne Frank receives a diary for her thirteenth birthday.
1943 – The Holocaust: Germany liquidates the Jewish Ghetto in Brzeżany, Poland (now Berezhany, Ukraine). Around 1,180 Jews are led to the city's old Jewish graveyard and shot.
1944 – World War II: Operation Overlord: American paratroopers of the 101st Airborne Division secure the town of Carentan, Normandy, France.
1954 – Pope Pius XII canonises Dominic Savio, who was 14 years old at the time of his death, as a saint, making him at the time the youngest unmartyred saint in the Roman Catholic Church. In 2017, Francisco and Jacinta Marto, aged ten and nine at the time of their deaths, are declared saints.
1963 – NAACP field secretary Medgar Evers is murdered in front of his home in Jackson, Mississippi by Ku Klux Klan member Byron De La Beckwith during the civil rights movement.
  1963   – The film Cleopatra, starring Elizabeth Taylor and Richard Burton, is released in US theaters. It was the most expensive film made at the time.
1964 – Anti-apartheid activist and ANC leader Nelson Mandela is sentenced to life in prison for sabotage in South Africa.
1967 – The United States Supreme Court in Loving v. Virginia declares all U.S. state laws which prohibit interracial marriage to be unconstitutional.
1975 – India, Judge Jagmohanlal Sinha of the city of Allahabad ruled that India's Prime Minister Indira Gandhi had used corrupt practices to win her seat in the Indian Parliament, and that she should be banned from holding any public office. Mrs. Gandhi sent word that she refused to resign.
1979 – Bryan Allen wins the second Kremer prize for a man-powered flight across the English Channel in the Gossamer Albatross.
1981 – The first of the Indiana Jones film franchise, Raiders of the Lost Ark, is released in theaters.
1982 – Nuclear disarmament rally and concert, New York City.
1987 – The Central African Republic's former emperor Jean-Bédel Bokassa is sentenced to death for crimes he had committed during his 13-year rule.
  1987   – Cold War: At the Brandenburg Gate, U.S. President Ronald Reagan publicly challenges Mikhail Gorbachev to tear down the Berlin Wall.
1988 – Austral Líneas Aéreas Flight 046, a McDonnell Douglas MD-81, crashes short of the runway at Libertador General José de San Martín Airport, killing all 22 people on board.
1990 – Russia Day: The parliament of the Russian Federation formally declares its sovereignty.
1991 – Russians first democratically elected Boris Yeltsin as the President of Russia.
  1991   – Kokkadichcholai massacre: The Sri Lankan Army massacres 152 minority Tamil civilians in the village of Kokkadichcholai near the eastern province town of Batticaloa.
1993 – An election takes place in Nigeria and is won by Moshood Kashimawo Olawale Abiola. Its results are later annulled by the military Government of Ibrahim Babangida.
1997 – Queen Elizabeth II reopens the Globe Theatre in London.
1999 – Kosovo War: Operation Joint Guardian begins when a NATO-led United Nations peacekeeping force (KFor) enters the province of Kosovo in Federal Republic of Yugoslavia. 
2009 – A disputed presidential election in Iran leads to wide-ranging local and international protests.
2014 – Between 1,095 and 1,700 Shia Iraqi people are killed in an attack by the Islamic State of Iraq and the Levant on Camp Speicher in Tikrit, Iraq. It's the second deadliest act of terrorism in history, only behind 9/11.
2016 – Forty-nine civilians are killed and 58 others injured in an attack on a gay nightclub in Orlando, Florida; the gunman, Omar Mateen, is killed in a gunfight with police.
2017 – American student Otto Warmbier returns home in a coma after spending 17 months in a North Korean prison and dies a week later.
2018 – United States President Donald Trump and Kim Jong-un of North Korea held the first meeting between leaders of their two countries in Singapore.

Births

Pre-1600
 950 – Reizei, Japanese emperor (d. 1011)
1107 – Gao Zong, Chinese emperor (d. 1187)
1161 – Constance, Duchess of Brittany (d. 1201)
1519 – Cosimo I de' Medici, Grand Duke of Tuscany (d. 1574)
1561 – Anna of Württemberg, German princess (d. 1616)
1564 – John Casimir, Duke of Saxe-Coburg (d. 1633)
1573 – Robert Radclyffe, 5th Earl of Sussex, soldier (d. 1629)
1577 – Paul Guldin, Swiss astronomer and mathematician (d. 1643)
1580 – Adriaen van Stalbemt, Flemish painter (d. 1662)

1601–1900
1653 – Maria Amalia of Courland, Landgravine of Hesse-Kassel (d. 1711)
1686 – Marie-Catherine Homassel Hecquet, French writer (d. 1764)
1711 – Louis Legrand, French priest and theologian (d. 1780)
1760 – Jean-Baptiste Louvet de Couvrai, French author, playwright, journalist, and politician (d. 1797)
1771 – Patrick Gass, American sergeant (Lewis and Clark Expedition) and author (d. 1870)
1775 – Karl Freiherr von Müffling, Prussian field marshal (d. 1851)
1777 – Robert Clark, American physician and politician (d. 1837)
1795 – John Marston, American sailor (d. 1885)
1798 – Samuel Cooper, American general (d. 1876)
1800 – Samuel Wright Mardis, American politician (d. 1836)
1802 – Harriet Martineau, English sociologist and author (d. 1876)
1806 – John A. Roebling, German-American engineer, designed the Brooklyn Bridge (d. 1869)
1807 – Ante Kuzmanić, Croatian physician and journalist (d. 1879)
1812 – Edmond Hébert, French geologist and academic (d. 1890)
1819 – Charles Kingsley, English priest, historian, and author (d. 1875)
1827 – Johanna Spyri, Swiss author, best known for Heidi (d. 1901)
1831 – Robert Herbert, English-Australian politician, 1st Premier of Queensland (d. 1905)
1841 – Watson Fothergill, English architect, designed the Woodborough Road Baptist Church (d. 1928)
1843 – David Gill, Scottish-English astronomer and author (d. 1914)
1851 – Oliver Lodge, English physicist and academic (d. 1940)
1857 – Maurice Perrault, Canadian architect, engineer, and politician, 15th Mayor of Longueuil (d. 1909)
1858 – Harry Johnston, English botanist and explorer (d. 1927)
  1858   – Henry Scott Tuke, English painter and photographer (d. 1929)
1861 – William Attewell, English cricketer and umpire (d. 1927)
1864 – Frank Chapman, American ornithologist, photographer, and author (d. 1945)
1877 – Thomas C. Hart, American admiral and politician (d. 1971)
1883 – Fernand Gonder, French pole vaulter (d. 1969)
  1883   – Robert Lowie, Austrian-American anthropologist and academic (d. 1957)
1888 – Zygmunt Janiszewski, Polish mathematician and academic (d. 1920)
1890 – Egon Schiele, Austrian soldier and painter (d. 1918)
1892 – Djuna Barnes, American novelist, journalist, and playwright (d. 1982)
1895 – Eugénie Brazier, French chef (d. 1977)
1897 – Anthony Eden, English soldier and politician, Prime Minister of the United Kingdom (d. 1977)
1899 – Fritz Albert Lipmann, German-American biochemist and academic, Nobel Prize laureate (d. 1986)
  1899   – Weegee, Ukrainian-American photographer and journalist (d. 1968)

1901–present
1902 – Hendrik Elias, Belgian lawyer and politician, Mayor of Ghent (d. 1973)
1905 – Ray Barbuti, American sprinter and football player (d. 1988)
1906 – Sandro Penna, Italian poet (d. 1977)
1908 – Alphonse Ouimet, Canadian broadcaster (d. 1988)
  1908   – Marina Semyonova, Russian ballerina and educator (d. 2010)
  1908   – Otto Skorzeny, German SS officer (d. 1975)
1910 – Bill Naughton, Irish-English playwright and author (d. 1992)
1912 – Bill Cowley, Canadian ice hockey player and coach (d. 1993)
  1912   – Carl Hovland, American psychologist and academic (d. 1961)
1913 – Jean Victor Allard, Canadian general (d. 1996)
  1913   – Desmond Piers, Canadian admiral (d. 2005)
1914 – William Lundigan, American actor (d. 1975)
  1914   – Go Seigen, Chinese-Japanese Go player (d. 2014)
1915 – Priscilla Lane, American actress (d. 1995)
  1915   – Christopher Mayhew, English soldier and politician (d. 1997)
  1915   – David Rockefeller, American banker and businessman (d. 2017)
1916 – Irwin Allen, American director and producer (d. 1991)
  1916   – Raúl Héctor Castro, Mexican-American politician and diplomat, 14th Governor of Arizona (d. 2015)
1918 – Samuel Z. Arkoff, American film producer (d. 2001)
  1918   – Georgia Louise Harris Brown, American architect (d. 1999)
  1918   – Christie Jayaratnam Eliezer, Sri Lankan-Australian mathematician and academic (d. 2001)
1919 – Uta Hagen, German-American actress and educator (d. 2004)
1920 – Dave Berg, American soldier and cartoonist (d. 2002)
  1920   – Peter Jones, English actor and screenwriter (d. 2000)
1921 – Luis García Berlanga, Spanish director and screenwriter (d. 2010)
  1921   – Christopher Derrick, English author, critic, and academic (d. 2007)
  1921   – James Archibald Houston, Canadian author and illustrator (d. 2005)
1922 – Margherita Hack, Italian astrophysicist and author (d. 2013)
1924 – George H. W. Bush, American lieutenant and politician, 41st President of the United States (d. 2018)
  1924   – Grete Dollitz, German-American guitarist and radio host (d. 2013)
1928 – Vic Damone, American singer-songwriter and actor (d. 2018)
  1928   – Petros Molyviatis, Greek politician and diplomat, Greek Minister for Foreign Affairs
  1928   – Richard M. Sherman, American composer and director
1929 – Brigid Brophy, English author and critic (d. 1995)
  1929   – Anne Frank, German-Dutch diarist; victim of the Holocaust (d. 1945)
  1929   – Jameel Jalibi, Pakistani linguist and academic (d. 2019)
  1929   – John McCluskey, Baron McCluskey, Scottish lawyer, judge, and politician, Solicitor General for Scotland (d. 2017)
1930 – Jim Burke, Australian cricketer (d. 1979)
  1930   – Donald Byrne, American chess player (d. 1976)
  1930   – Innes Ireland, Scottish race car driver and engineer (d. 1993)
  1930   – Jim Nabors, American actor and singer (d. 2017)
1931 – Trevanian, American author and scholar (d. 2005)
  1931   – Rona Jaffe, American novelist (d. 2005)
1932 – Mimi Coertse, South African soprano and producer
  1932   – Mamo Wolde, Ethiopian runner (d. 2002)
1933 – Eddie Adams, American photographer and journalist (d. 2004)
1934 – John A. Alonzo, American actor and cinematographer (d. 2001)
  1934   – Kevin Billington, English director and producer (d. 2021)
1935 – Ian Craig, Australian cricketer (d. 2014)
  1935   – Paul Kennedy, English lawyer and judge
1937 – Vladimir Arnold, Russian-French mathematician and academic (d. 2010)
  1937   – Klaus Basikow, German footballer and manager (d. 2015)
  1937   – Antal Festetics, Hungarian-Austrian biologist and zoologist
  1937   – Chips Moman, American record producer, guitarist, and songwriter (d. 2016) 
1938 – Jean-Marie Doré, Guinean lawyer and politician, 11th Prime Minister of Guinea (d. 2016)
  1938   – Tom Oliver, English-Australian actor
1939 – Ron Lynch, Australian rugby league player and coach 
  1939   – Frank McCloskey, American sergeant and politician (d. 2003)
1940 – Jacques Brassard, Canadian educator and politician
1941 – Marv Albert, American sportscaster
  1941   – Chick Corea, American pianist and composer (d. 2021)
  1941   – Roy Harper, English singer-songwriter, guitarist, and actor
  1941   – Reg Presley, English singer-songwriter (d. 2013)
  1941   – Lucille Roybal-Allard, American politician
1942 – Len Barry, American singer-songwriter and producer (d. 2020)
  1942   – Bert Sakmann, German physiologist and biologist, Nobel Prize laureate
1945 – Pat Jennings, Irish footballer and coach
1946 – Michel Bergeron, Canadian ice hockey player and coach
  1946   – Bobby Gould, English footballer and manager
  1946   – Catherine Bréchignac, French physicist and academic
1948 – Hans Binder, Austrian race car driver
  1948   – Herbert Meyer, German footballer
  1948   – Len Wein, American comic book writer and editor (d. 2017)
1949 – Jens Böhrnsen, German judge and politician
  1949   – Marc Tardif, Canadian ice hockey player
  1949   – John Wetton, English singer-songwriter, bass player, and producer (d. 2017)
1950 – Oğuz Abadan, Turkish singer-songwriter and guitarist
  1950   – Michael Fabricant, English politician
  1950   – Sonia Manzano, American actress
1950 – Bun E. Carlos, American drummer
1951 – Brad Delp, American musician and singer (d. 2007)
  1951   – Andranik Margaryan, Armenian engineer and politician, 10th Prime Minister of Armenia (d. 2007)
1952 – Spencer Abraham, American academic and politician, 10th United States Secretary of Energy
  1952   – Junior Brown, American country music singer-songwriter and guitarist
  1952   – Pete Farndon, English bass player and songwriter (d. 1983)
1953 – Rocky Burnette, American singer-songwriter and guitarist
1954 – Tim Razzall, Baron Razzall, English lawyer and politician
1956 – Terry Alderman, Australian cricketer and sportscaster
1957 – Timothy Busfield, American actor, director, and producer
  1957   – Javed Miandad, Pakistani cricketer and coach
1958 – Meredith Brooks, American singer-songwriter and guitarist
1959 – John Linnell, American singer-songwriter and musician 
  1959   – Scott Thompson, Canadian actor and comedian 
1960 – Joe Kopicki, American basketball player and coach
1962 – Jordan Peterson, Canadian psychologist, professor and cultural critic
1963 – Philippe Bugalski, French race car driver (d. 2012)
  1963   – Warwick Capper, Australian footballer, coach, and actor
  1963   – Tim DeKay, American actor
  1963   – Jerry Lynn, American wrestler
1964 – Derek Higgins, Irish race car driver
  1964   – Kent Jones, American journalist
  1964   – Paula Marshall, American actress
  1964   – Peter Such, Scottish-born, English cricketer
1965 – Adrian Toole, Australian rugby league player 
  1965   – Gwen Torrence, American sprinter
  1965   – Cathy Tyson, English actress
1966 – Marc Glanville, Australian rugby league player 
  1966   – Tom Misteli, Swiss cell biologist
1967 – Aivar Kuusmaa, Estonian basketball player and coach
  1967   – Frances O'Connor, English-Australian actress
1968 – Scott Aldred, American baseball player and coach
  1968   – Bobby Sheehan, American bass player and songwriter (d. 1999)
1969 – Zsolt Daczi, Hungarian guitarist (d. 2007)
  1969   – Héctor Garza, Mexican wrestler (d. 2013)
  1969   – Mathieu Schneider, American ice hockey player
  1969   – Heinz-Christian Strache, Austrian politician
1971 – Mark Henry, American weightlifter and wrestler
  1971   – Ryan Klesko, American baseball player
  1971   – Jérôme Romain, Caribbean-Dominican triple jumper and coach
1973 – Jason Caffey, American basketball player and coach
  1973   – Darryl White, Australian footballer
1974 – Flávio Conceição, Brazilian footballer 
  1974   – Hideki Matsui, Japanese baseball player
  1974   – Jason Mewes, American actor and producer
  1974   – Kerry Kittles, American basketball player
1975 – Bryan Alvarez, American wrestler and journalist
  1975   – Stéphanie Szostak, French-American actress
1976 – Antawn Jamison, American basketball player and sportscaster
  1976   – Ray Price, Zimbabwean cricketer
  1976   – Thomas Sørensen, Danish footballer
  1976   – Paul Stenning, English author
1977 – Wade Redden, Canadian ice hockey player
1978 – Lewis Moody, English rugby player
1979 – Dallas Clark, American football player
  1979   – Martine Dugrenier, Canadian wrestler
  1979   – Diego Milito, Argentine footballer
  1979   – Robyn, Swedish singer-songwriter, musician, and record producer
  1979   – Earl Watson, American basketball player and coach
1980 – Marco Bortolami, Italian rugby player
1981 – Raitis Grafs, Latvian basketball player
  1981   – Adriana Lima, Brazilian model and actress
1982 – Shailaja Pujari, Indian weightlifter
1983 – Bryan Habana, South African rugby player
  1983   – Christine Sinclair, Canadian soccer player
1984 – James Kwalia, Kenyan-Qatari runner
  1984   – Bruno Soriano, Spanish footballer
1985 – Blake Ross, American computer programmer, co-created Mozilla Firefox
  1985   – Kendra Wilkinson, American model, actress, and author
1986 – Salim Mehajer, Australian politician
1988 – Eren Derdiyok, Swiss footballer
  1988   – Mauricio Isla, Chilean footballer
1989 – Emma Eliasson, Swedish ice hockey player
  1989   – Ibrahim Jeilan, Ethiopian runner
1990 – Jrue Holiday, American basketball player
  1990   – David Worrall, English footballer
1992 – Philippe Coutinho, Brazilian footballer
1996 – Annalisa Cochrane, American actress
1996 – Shonica Wharton, Barbadian netball player
1999 – Ajey Nagar, Indian youtuber

Deaths

Pre-1600
 796 – Hisham I, Muslim emir ( 757)
 816 – Pope Leo III (b. 750)
 918 – Æthelflæd, Mercian daughter of Alfred the Great (b. 870)
1020 – Lyfing, English archbishop (b. 999)
1036 – Tedald, Italian bishop (b. 990)
1144 – Al-Zamakhshari, Persian theologian (b. 1075)
1152 – Henry of Scotland, 3rd Earl of Huntingdon (b. 1114)
1266 – Henry II, Prince of Anhalt-Aschersleben (b. 1215)
1294 – John I of Brienne, Count of Eu
1418 – Bernard VII, Count of Armagnac (b. 1360)
1420 – Adolf I, Count of Nassau-Siegen (b. 1362)
1435 – John FitzAlan, 14th Earl of Arundel, English commander (b. 1408)
1478 – Ludovico III Gonzaga, Marquis of Mantua (b. 1412)
1524 – Diego Velázquez de Cuéllar, Spanish conquistador (b. 1465)
1560 – Ii Naomori, Japanese warrior (b. 1506)
  1560   – Imagawa Yoshimoto, Japanese daimyō (b. 1519)
1565 – Adrianus Turnebus, French philologist and scholar (b. 1512)
1567 – Richard Rich, 1st Baron Rich, English politician, Lord Chancellor of England (b. 1490)

1601–1900
1647 – Thomas Farnaby, English scholar and educator (b. 1575)
1668 – Charles Berkeley, 2nd Viscount Fitzhardinge, English politician (b. 1599)
1675 – Charles Emmanuel II, Duke of Savoy (b. 1634)
1734 – James FitzJames, 1st Duke of Berwick, French-English general and politician, Lord Lieutenant of Hampshire (b. 1670)
1758 – Prince Augustus William of Prussia (b. 1722)
1772 – Marc-Joseph Marion du Fresne, French explorer (b. 1724)
1778 – Philip Livingston, American merchant and politician (b. 1716)
1816 – Pierre Augereau, French general (b. 1757)
1818 – Egwale Seyon, Ethiopian emperor 
1841 – Konstantinos Nikolopoulos, Greek composer, archaeologist, and philologist (b. 1786)
1900 – Lucretia Peabody Hale, American journalist and author (b. 1820)

1901–present
1904 – Camille of Renesse-Breidbach (b. 1836)
1912 – Frédéric Passy, French economist and academic, Nobel Prize laureate (b. 1822)
1917 – Teresa Carreño, Venezuelan-American singer-songwriter, pianist, and conductor (b. 1853)
1932 – Theo Heemskerk, Dutch lawyer and politician, Prime Minister of the Netherlands (b. 1852)
1937 – Mikhail Tukhachevsky, Russian general (b. 1893)
1944 – Erich Marcks, German general (b. 1891)
1946 – Médéric Martin, Canadian politician, mayor of Montreal (b. 1869)
1952 – Harry Lawson, Australian politician, 27th Premier of Victoria (b. 1875)
1957 – Jimmy Dorsey, American saxophonist, composer, and bandleader (The Dorsey Brothers and The California Ramblers) (b. 1904)
1962 – John Ireland, English composer and educator (b. 1879)
1963 – Medgar Evers, American soldier and activist (b. 1925)
1966 – Hermann Scherchen, German viola player and conductor (b. 1891)
1968 – Herbert Read, English poet and critic (b. 1893)
1969 – Aleksandr Deyneka, Ukrainian-Russian painter and sculptor (b. 1899)
1972 – Edmund Wilson, American critic, essayist, and editor (b. 1895)
  1972   – Dinanath Gopal Tendulkar, Indian writer and documentary filmmaker (b. 1909)
1976 – Gopinath Kaviraj, Indian philosopher and scholar (b. 1887)
1978 – Guo Moruo, Chinese historian, author, and poet (b. 1892)
  1978   – Georg Siimenson, Estonian footballer (b. 1912)
1980 – Billy Butlin, South African-English businessman, founded the Butlins Company (b. 1899)
  1980   – Masayoshi Ōhira, Japanese politician, 68th Prime minister of Japan (b. 1910)
  1980   – Milburn Stone, American actor (b. 1904)
1982 – Ian McKay, English sergeant, Victoria Cross recipient (b. 1953)
  1982   – Karl von Frisch, Austrian-German ethologist and academic, Nobel Prize laureate (b. 1886)
1983 – Norma Shearer, Canadian-American actress (b. 1902)
1989 – Bruce Hamilton, Australian public servant (b. 1911)
1990 – Terence O'Neill, Baron O'Neill of the Maine, English captain and politician, 4th Prime Minister of Northern Ireland (b. 1914)
1994 – Menachem Mendel Schneerson, Russian-American rabbi and author (b. 1902)
1994 – Nicole Brown Simpson, ex-wife of O. J. Simpson (b. 1959) and Ron Goldman, restaurant employee (b. 1968)
1995 – Arturo Benedetti Michelangeli, Italian pianist (b. 1920)
  1995   – Pierre Russell, American basketball player (b. 1949) 
1997 – Bulat Okudzhava, Russian singer-songwriter and guitarist (b. 1924)
1998 – Leo Buscaglia, American author and educator (b. 1924)
  1998   – Theresa Merritt, American actress and singer (b. 1922)
1999 – J. F. Powers, American novelist and short story writer (b. 1917)
2000 – Purushottam Laxman Deshpande, Indian actor, director, and producer (b. 1919)
2002 – Bill Blass, American fashion designer, founded Bill Blass Limited (b. 1922)
  2002   – Zena Sutherland, American reviewer of children's literature (b. 1915)
2003 – Gregory Peck, American actor and political activist (b. 1916)
2005 – Scott Young, Canadian journalist and author (b. 1918)
2006 – Nicky Barr, Australian rugby player and fighter pilot (b. 1915)
  2006   – György Ligeti, Romanian-Hungarian composer and educator (b. 1923)
  2006   – Kenneth Thomson, 2nd Baron Thomson of Fleet, Canadian businessman and art collector (b. 1923)
2008 – Miroslav Dvořák, Czech ice hockey player (b. 1951)
  2008   – Derek Tapscott, Welsh footballer and manager (b. 1932)
2010 – Al Williamson, American illustrator (b. 1931)
2011 – René Audet, Canadian bishop (b. 1920)
  2011   – Carl Gardner, American singer (The Coasters) (b. 1928)
2012 – Hector Bianciotti, Argentinian-French journalist and author (b. 1930)
  2012   – Margarete Mitscherlich-Nielsen, Danish-German psychoanalyst and author (b. 1917)
  2012   – Medin Zhega, Albanian footballer and manager (b. 1946)
  2012   – Elinor Ostrom, American  political scientist and economist, Nobel Prize laureate (b. 1933)
  2012   – Pahiño, Spanish footballer (b. 1923)
  2012   – Frank Walker, Australian judge and politician, 41st Attorney General of New South Wales (b. 1942)
2013 – Teresita Barajuen, Spanish nun (b. 1908)
2014 – Nabil Hemani, Algerian footballer (b. 1979)
  2014   – Dan Jacobson, South African-English author and critic (b. 1929)
  2014   – Frank Schirrmacher, German journalist (b. 1959)
2015 – Fernando Brant, Brazilian journalist, poet, and composer (b. 1946)
2018 – Jon Hiseman, English drummer (b. 1944)
2019 – Sylvia Miles, American actress (b. 1924)
2022 – Philip Baker Hall, American actor (b. 1931)
  2022   – Phil Bennett, Welsh rugby union player (b. 1948)

Holidays and observances
Chaco Armistice Day (Paraguay)
Christian feast day:
108 Martyrs of World War II
Basilides, Cyrinus, Nabor and Nazarius
Blessed Hildegard Burjan
Enmegahbowh (Episcopal Church)
Eskil
First Ecumenical Council (Lutheran)
Gaspar Bertoni
John of Sahagún
Onuphrius
Pope Leo III
Ternan
June 12 (Eastern Orthodox liturgics)
Dia dos Namorados (Brazil)
Helsinki Day (Finland)
Independence Day, celebrates the independence of the Philippines from Spain in 1898.
June 12 Commemoration (Lagos State)
Loving Day (United States)
Russia Day (Russia)
World Day Against Child Labour, and its related observances:
Children's Day (Haiti)

References

External links

 
 
 

Days of the year
June